Arturo Porro (13 November 1919 – 1990) was a Uruguayan sports shooter. He competed in the trap event at the 1968 Summer Olympics.

References

1919 births
1990 deaths
Uruguayan male sport shooters
Olympic shooters of Uruguay
Shooters at the 1968 Summer Olympics
Sportspeople from Montevideo